The 2011 Korea National League was the ninth season of the Korea National League. The number of post-season playoffs' teams were increased to six and the playoffs were operated in the same format as the K League Championship. Before the start of the 2011 season, Yesan FC withdrew from the league due to its financial difficulty.

Teams

Regular season

League table

Results

Championship playoffs

Bracket

First round

Second round

Semi-final

Final

Hyundai Mipo Dockyard won 2–1 on aggregate.

Top scorers

Danilo Teixeira who played the least time among top goalscorers won the top goalscorer award

Awards

Main awards

Best XI

See also
 2011 in South Korean football
 2011 Korea National League Championship
 2011 Korean FA Cup

References

External links

Korea National League seasons